RTS 1 is a Swiss public television channel owned by RTS Radio Télévision Suisse, the public broadcaster for the Romand people.

History 
Launched on 1 May 1954 to succeed Télé Genève, RTS Un is the first channel of the two Swiss French networks of television group RTS (the other being RTS Deux).
In 1968 the channel first aired programmes in colour.

RTS took part in the creation of TV5 in 1984, and provides programmes for the international channel.

Following the launch of TSR 2 in 1997, TSR renamed itself to TSR 1 and RTS Un in 2012.

RTS Un is available in Aosta Valley, Italy, due to Italian self-government laws, and until the cessation of all digital terrestrial signals in Switzerland in 2019 could also be received in the border areas via spillover.

Logos and identities

See also 
 26 minutes
 Station Horizon

References

External links

Television stations in Switzerland
1954 establishments in Switzerland
Television channels and stations established in 1954
French-language television in Switzerland